Magdaléna Rybáriková was the defending champion, but chose to compete in Madrid instead. 

Katie Boulter won the title, defeating Ksenia Lykina in the final, 5–7, 6–4, 6–2.

Seeds

Draw

Finals

Top half

Bottom half

References
Main Draw

Fukuoka International Women's Cup - Singles
Fukuoka International Women's Cup